Thottakad  is a village in Kottayam district in the state of Kerala, India. The nearest towns are Changanacherry and Kottayam.

Demographics
 India census, Thottakad had a population of 15,391 with 7,531 males and 7,860 females.

Transportation
Thottakad is a village in Kottayam district, in Kerla state. There are many buses passing via Thottakad. Main bus routes are - Kottayam–Mallappally, Kottayam–Karukachal, Kottayam–Manimala. Thottakad is 14 kilometres from Kottayam town towards karukachal route.

Temples and churches
St.George Catholic Church, Mar Aprem Church, Pentecostal Church of God [IPC], Assemblies of God church [Pentecostal church], The Pentecostal Mission [TPM], Eravuchira St. Mary's Church, P.R.D.S.Church, Koduvelil, St Mary's Bethelahem Orthodox Church Thottakad, Thottakad Sankaranarayana Swami Temple, Sreenarayanaguru Temple Thottakkadu, Kuruthikaaman Kaavu Temple, and Rajamattom Church.Thottakkad Sree Sankaranarayana Swamy Temple is one of the important temples of the glory days of King Thekkumkoor. When Thekkumkoor became part of Venad during the reign of King Marthanda Varma, most of Thottakkad belonged to Devaswom. The temple, which is over a thousand years old, was under the control of the government.

Administration
Thottakadu is under the Puthupally Grama Panchayath. It is located 14 kilometres west of District headquarters Kottayam. Thottakadu's residents are mostly members of Syrian Christian, Nair and Ezhava communities.

Post Office
There is a post office in this village and the pin code is 686539.

Essential Data
 
 Village  Thottakadu
 	
 Block  Pallom
 	
 District  Kottayam 
 	
 State  Kerala
 	
 Country  India 
 	
 Continent  Asia 
 	
 Time Zone IST (UTC + 05:30) 
 	
 Currency  Indian Rupee (INR )
 	
 Dialing Code  +91
 	
 Date format  dd/mm/yyyy
 	
 Driving side left
 	
 Language Malayalam

Educational institutions 
 Eravuchira St. George UPS
 Thottakad Government School
 St. Thomas School Thottakad
 Government B.Ed Center Thottakad
 H.W.L.P. School.
 CMS LP School, Ezhuvanthanam

References

Villages in Kottayam district